The Sioux Falls Skyforce is an American professional basketball team of the NBA G League based in Sioux Falls, South Dakota, and is affiliated with the Miami Heat. The team plays its home games in the Sanford Pentagon, a place it has called home since the 2013–14 season. The Sioux Falls Skyforce is the longest-running minor-league basketball team in the United States.

The Skyforce began in the Continental Basketball Association (CBA) in 1989, playing its home games at Sioux Falls Arena from then until the move to the Pentagon in 2013. It participated in four CBA championship finals, winning the championship trophy in 1996 (defeating the Fort Wayne Fury, four games to one) and 2005 (defeating the Rockford Lightning three games to one).

History
The team's name was chosen from two entries in a contest to name the team in 1989 which yielded 1,045 suggestions. The names "Sky" and "Force" were combined to create the "Skyforce".

The Skyforce also hosted the CBA All-Star Game three times: in 1996, 2000, and 2003.

In 2006, the Skyforce joined the D-League. In its first two seasons in the D-League, it was a playoff contender. In 2009, the team suffered a 2–1 series loss in the first round to the Tulsa 66ers. In 2014, it fared a bit better, sweeping the Canton Charge in the first round before being swept by the eventual champion Fort Wayne Mad Ants in the semifinals. In 2016, the Skyforce won its first D-League championship, defeating the Los Angeles D-Fenders 2 games to 1. The Skyforce also finished the 2016 season 40–10, the winningest regular season record in D-League history.

On June 10, 2013, the Miami Heat announced that it had entered into a single affiliation partnership with the Skyforce, beginning with the 2013–14 season. The Miami Heat signature red/yellow color scheme was adopted into the Skyforce's jerseys, logo, and merchandise following this announcement. On June 1, 2017, the Heat purchased a controlling interest in the Skyforce with the Heineman family retaining its minority share. The former ownership group of Bob Correa, Greg Heineman, Roger Larsen, and Tom Walsh had purchased the Skyforce from the Kemper Lesnik Organization in May 1993.

Year-by-year record

Head coaches

Current roster

NBA affiliates
Miami Heat (2009–present)
Charlotte Bobcats (2007–2009)
Detroit Pistons (2006–2007)
Minnesota Timberwolves (2006–2013)
Orlando Magic (2011–2013)
Philadelphia 76ers (2012–2013)

See also
Sioux Falls Skyforce seasons

References

External links
Sioux Falls Skyforce official site

 
Basketball teams established in 1989
Basketball teams in South Dakota
Charlotte Bobcats
Detroit Pistons
Philadelphia 76ers
Miami Heat
Minnesota Timberwolves
Orlando Magic
1989 establishments in South Dakota